Racecourse Ground Promenade was a cricket ground in Northampton, Northamptonshire, situated  within what was Northampton Racecourse.  The first recorded match on the ground was in 1844, when the Gentlemen of the North played the Gentlemen of the South.  The ground held its only first-class match in 1872 when a United North of England Eleven played a United South of England Eleven.  The ground held its final recorded match in 1885 when Northamptonshire played Warwickshire.

With the demise of the racecourse in 1904, the ground is today the location of Racecourse Park, a large open public space in the centre of Northampton.

References

External links
Racecourse Ground Promenade on CricketArchive
Racecourse Ground Promenade on Cricinfo

Defunct cricket grounds in England
Sports venues in Northampton
Cricket grounds in Northamptonshire
Defunct sports venues in Northamptonshire
Sports venues completed in 1844